The Concord Building is a building located in downtown Portland, Oregon listed on the National Register of Historic Places.

See also
 National Register of Historic Places listings in Southwest Portland, Oregon

References

Further reading

External links

1891 establishments in Oregon
Commercial buildings completed in 1891
Buildings designated early commercial in the National Register of Historic Places
National Register of Historic Places in Portland, Oregon
Portland Historic Landmarks
Southwest Portland, Oregon